Davide Zanotelli (born 19 May 1988 in Trento, Italy) is an Italian curler.

Teams

References

External links

Search Results for: Davide Zanotelli - FISG - Federazione Italiana Sport del Ghiaccio

Living people
1988 births
Sportspeople from Trento
Italian male curlers